The Hon. Frederick Stephen Archibald Hanbury-Tracy (15 September 1848 – 9 August 1906), was a British politician.

Life 
Hanbury-Tracy was a younger son of Thomas Hanbury-Tracy, 2nd Baron Sudeley, and his wife Emma Elizabeth Alicia, daughter of George Hay Dawkins-Pennant, of Baron Penrhyn's family. Charles Hanbury-Tracy, 4th Baron Sudeley, was his elder brother. He was educated privately and at Trinity College, Cambridge, where he graduated BA. He served as a major in the Worcester Yeomanry, and retired as a lieutenant-colonel.

He succeeded the latter as Member of Parliament for Montgomery in 1877, a seat he held until 1885, and again from 1886 to 1892.

Family 
Hanbury-Tracy married in 1870 Helena Caroline Winnington, the only daughter of Sir Thomas Winnington, 4th Baronet by Anna Helena Domville.
They had issue:
 Eric Hanbury-Tracy (b1871), and officer in the Coldstream Guards, who married in 1902 Dorothy Greathed, daughter of General Sir Edward Greathed
 Edith Julia Helena Hanbury-Tracy (b1872)
 Cyprienne Emma Madeleine Hanbury-Tracy, (b1874)
 Violet Mary Claudia Hanbury-Tracy (1876-1963), married 1900 Wyndham Dunstan.
 Hilda Adelaide Eleanor Hanbury-Tracy (b1877)
 Gwyneth Rose Coda Hanbury-Tracy (b1879)

He died 9 August 1906, aged 57.

References 

 Debrett's Peerage and Baronetage (107th edition) editor Charles Mosley 2 volumes (London 2010)
 Burke's Peerage, Baronetage and Knightage including Extinct, Dormant and Abeyant titles (London 1999)
 G E Cokayne (ed.), Complete Peerage of Great Britain and Ireland, 20 volumes (London 1937)

External links 
 

1848 births
1906 deaths
Younger sons of barons
UK MPs 1874–1880
UK MPs 1880–1885
UK MPs 1886–1892
Liberal Party (UK) MPs for Welsh constituencies
Hanbury-Tracy family